Bhut or Bhoot is a village in Shaheed Bhagat Singh Nagar district of Punjab State, India. The village is administrated by a Sarpanch, an elected representative of the village.

Demography 
As of 2011, Bhut has a total number of 321 houses and population of 1523,  of which 774 include are males while 749 are females according to the report published by Census India in 2011. The literacy rate of Bhut is 80.03%, higher than the state average of 75.84%. The population of children under the age of 6 years is 146, which is 9.59% of total population of Bhut, and the child sex ratio is approximately 802 as compared to the Punjab state average of 846.

Most of the people are from Schedule Caste which constitutes 51.94% of the total population in Bhut. The town does not have any Schedule Tribe population so far.

As per the report published by Census India in 2011, 493 people were engaged in work activities out of the total population of Bhut which includes 415 males and 78 females. 76.88% of workers describe their work as main work and 23.12% workers are involved in marginal activity providing livelihood for less than 6 months.

Education 
The village has a Punjabi medium, co-ed primary school founded in 1953. The schools provide mid-day meal as per Indian Midday Meal Scheme. The school provide free education to children between the ages of 6 and 14 as per the Right of Children to Free and Compulsory Education Act.

Amardeep Singh Shergill Memorial college Mukandpur and Sikh National College Banga are the nearest colleges.

Transport 

See also 
List of villages in India

References

External links 
 Tourism of Punjab 
 Census of Punjab
 Locality Based PINCode

Villages in Shaheed Bhagat Singh Nagar district